Pleasant Garden is a town in Guilford County, North Carolina, United States. The population was 4,489 at the 2010 census.

History
Incorporated in 1997 from Fentress Township, Pleasant Garden was first settled in 1786, and known as a business district by that name from at least 1876.

Geography
Pleasant Garden is located at  (35.961103, -79.763387). It is situated south of Greensboro, west of Forest Oaks, and north of Climax. It is bordered both east and west by U.S. Route 421 and Old U.S. Highway 220 (Randleman Road) (Respectively), and to the north by Interstate 85.

Demographics

2020 census

As of the 2020 United States census, there were 5,000 people, 1,817 households, and 1,220 families residing in the town.

2000 census
As of the census of 2000, there were 4,714 people, 1,783 households, and 1,383 families residing in the town. The population density was 307.2 people per square mile (118.6/km). There were 1,874 housing units at an average density of 122.1 per square mile (47.2/km). The racial makeup of the town was 85.19% White, 11.24% African American, 1.08% Native American, 0.23% Asian, 0.02% Pacific Islander, 1.04% from other races, and 1.19% from two or more races. Hispanic or Latino of any race were 1.63% of the population.

There were 1,783 households, out of which 34.1% had children under the age of 18 living with them, 65.3% were married couples living together, 8.4% had a female householder with no husband present, and 22.4% were non-families. 18.4% of all households were made up of individuals, and 7.6% had someone living alone who was 65 years of age or older. The average household size was 2.62 and the average family size was 2.97.

In the town, the population was spread out, with 25.0% under the age of 18, 5.6% from 18 to 24, 29.3% from 25 to 44, 27.9% from 45 to 64, and 12.2% who were 65 years of age or older. The median age was 39 years. For every 100 females, there were 96.0 males. For every 100 females age 18 and over, there were 93.5 males.

The median income for a household in the town was $45,833, and the median income for a family was $51,818. Males had a median income of $36,052 versus $29,778 for females. The per capita income for the town was $20,679. About 8.0% of families and 8.9% of the population were below the poverty line, including 10.5% of those under age 18 and 13.5% of those age 65 or over.

Notable people
Dennis Byrd, defensive tackle at North Carolina State, member of the College Football Hall of Fame
Joey Hackett, former NFL tight end
Shane Hmiel, former NASCAR driver

References

External links
 Official website

Towns in Guilford County, North Carolina
Towns in North Carolina